Suchosaurus (meaning "crocodile lizard") is a spinosaurid dinosaur from Cretaceous England and Portugal, originally believed to be a genus of crocodile. The type material, consisting of teeth, was used by British palaeontologist Richard Owen to name the species S. cultridens in 1841. Later in 1897, French palaeontologist Henri-Émile Sauvage named a second species, S. girardi, based on two fragments from the mandible and one tooth discovered in Portugal. Suchosaurus is possibly a senior synonym of the contemporary spinosaurid Baryonyx, but is usually considered a dubious name due to the paucity of its remains, and is considered an indeterminate baryonychine. In the Wadhurst Clay Formation of what is now southern England, Suchosaurus lived alongside other dinosaurs, as well as plesiosaurs, mammals, and crocodyliforms.

History of discovery
In about 1820, British palaeontologist Gideon Mantell acquired teeth discovered near Cuckfield in the Wadhurst Clay of East Sussex, part of a lot with the present inventory number BMNH R36536. In 1822, he reported these, after an identification by William Clift, as belonging to crocodiles. In 1824, the teeth were mentioned and illustrated by Georges Cuvier, representing the first fossil illustration of a spinosaurid dinosaur (though this group wouldn't be recognized for nearly another century). In 1827 Mantell described additional teeth, pointing out the similarities to the crocodilians Teleosaurus and Gavialis. One of these teeth is the present specimen BMNH R4415, others are part of BMNH R36536.

In 1841, British palaeontologist Richard Owen named, based on BMNH R36536 as a syntype series, a subgenus Crocodylus (Suchosaurus) with as type species Crocodylus (Suchosaurus) cultridens. The subgeneric name was derived from Greek σοῦχος, souchos, the name of the Egyptian crocodile god Sobek. This reflected the presumed taxonomic affinities; at the time the crocodile-like snouts of spinosaurids were not known. The specific name is derived from Latin culter, "dagger", and dens, "tooth", in reference to the elongated form of the teeth. In 1842, Owen again mentioned the taxon as a subgenus, subsequently he and other workers would use it as a full genus Suchosaurus. In 1842 and 1878 Owen referred some vertebrae (backbones) to Suchosaurus, but these were later identified by Richard Lydekker as likely belonging to ornithischian dinosaurs instead. In 1884, Owen indicated a tooth as "Suchosaurus leavidens" in a caption, this is usually seen as a lapsus calami (or "slip of the pen") because this species is not further mentioned.

In 1897, French palaeontologist Henri-Émile Sauvage named a second species: Suchosaurus girardi, based on two jaw fragments (specimen MG324) and a tooth, found in the Papo Seco Formation of Portugal by Swiss-Portuguese geologist Paul Choffat. The specific name honours French geologist Albert Girard. The tooth was considered lost but was rediscovered and in 2013 reported as specimen MNHN/UL.I.F2.176.1, part of remains recovered after a fire in 1978.

During the nineteenth and most of the twentieth century, Suchosaurus was usually considered to have been some obscure crocodilian, perhaps belonging to the Pholidosauridae. Single comparable teeth discovered in England were referred to the genus. However, when publishing a redescription of Baryonyx in 1998, British palaeontologist Angela Milner realised that the teeth of that spinosaurid dinosaur were extremely similar to those of Suchosaurus. In 2003, she suggested both genera represented one and the same animal. An identity would imply the name Suchosaurus has priority. However, the Suchosaurus teeth are also indistinguishable from those of Cristatusaurus and Suchomimus, making it an indeterminate baryonychine.

In 2007, French palaeontologist Eric Buffetaut considered the teeth of S. girardi very similar to those of Baryonyx (and S. cultridens) except for the stronger development of the ribs (lengthwise ridges) on the tooth crown, suggesting that the remains belonged to the same genus. Buffetaut agreed with Milner that the teeth of S. cultridens were almost identical to those of B. walkeri, but with a ribbier surface. The former taxon might be a senior synonym of the latter (since it was published first), depending on whether the differences were within a taxon or between different ones. According to Buffetaut, since the holotype specimen of S. cultridens is one worn tooth and that of B. walkeri is a skeleton it would be more practical to retain the newer name. In 2011, Portuguese palaeontologist Octávio Mateus and colleagues agreed that Suchosaurus was closely related to Baryonyx, but considered both species in the former genus (Suchosaurus) nomina dubia (dubious names) since their holotype specimens were not considered diagnostic (lacking distinguishing features) and could not be definitely equated with other taxa.

Description 

The teeth of Suchosaurus girardi were curved, oval in cross section, and had tall roots that were one and a half times taller than the crown. Its teeth, like some other spinosaurids, bore flutes (lengthwise grooves), in S. girardi, there were eight flutes on the lingual side (which faced the inside of the mouth), and four less distinct flutes on the labial side (which faced the outside of the mouth). The tooth enamel, or outermost layer, had a microscopic wrinkled texture.

Palaeoecology 
The Wadhurst Clay Formation, part of the Wealden Group, is dated to the Valanginian stage of the Early Cretaceous Period, about 139.8 to 132.9 million years ago. It consists mainly of shales and mudstones. Other dinosaurs that shared this environment with Suchosaurus included the iguanodontians Barilium and Hypselospinus, as well as the dubious species Megalosaurus dunkeri and an unnamed maniraptoran. They coexisted with the plesiosaur Hastanectes, the crocodyliform Goniopholis and the mammals Loxaulax, Aegialodon, Laolestes, and Spalacotherium.

References

External links

First post of a long discussion of Suchosaurus as a dinosaur and its implications, in the Dinosaur Mailing List Archives

Spinosaurids
Barremian life
Valanginian life
Early Cretaceous dinosaurs of Europe
Cretaceous England
Fossils of England
Cretaceous Portugal
Fossils of Portugal
Fossil taxa described in 1841
Taxa named by Richard Owen
Nomina dubia